Pennsylvania Railroad Bridge over Shavers Creek, also known as Conrail Bridge over Shavers Creek, is a historic multi-span stone arch bridge spanning Shavers Creek and located at Logan Township and Petersburg, Huntingdon County, Pennsylvania.  It was built by the Pennsylvania Railroad in 1889.  It measures .

It was added to the National Register of Historic Places in 1990.

References

Railroad bridges on the National Register of Historic Places in Pennsylvania
Bridges completed in 1889
Bridges in Huntingdon County, Pennsylvania
Pennsylvania Railroad bridges
National Register of Historic Places in Huntingdon County, Pennsylvania
Stone arch bridges in the United States